Lim Wan-Sup (born 15 August 1971) is a South Korean football manager.

Career
Lim appointed as manager of Ansan Greeners in September 2018.
Lim left Ansan Greeners on December 23, 2019, as a result of mutual termination.
Lim was appointed as manager of Incheon United on February 6, 2020 to lead the club in the upcoming 2020 K League 1 season.

References

1971 births
Living people
South Korean football managers
Ansan Greeners FC managers
K League 2 managers